The 2010 season of the astronomy TV show Jack Horkheimer: Star Gazer starring Jack Horkheimer started on January 4, 2010. As a consequence of Jack Horkheimer's death on August 20, 2010, the episodes which were recorded for the last four months of 2010 were hosted by guest hosts. The episodes for the month of September 2010 were the last to be based on scripts written by Jack Horkheimer.  The show's episode numbering scheme changed several times during its run to coincide with major events in the show's history. The official Star Gazer website hosts the complete scripts for each of the shows.


2010 season

References

External links 
  Star Gazer official website
 
 Jack Horkheimer Passes Away at 72- the "Sky and Telescope" magazine article confirmed that Jack Horkheimer had appeared in 1708 episodes.

Lists of Jack Horkheimer: Star Gazer episodes
2010 American television seasons